Nazarkahrizi Rural District is in Nazarkahrizi District of Hashtrud County, East Azerbaijan province, Iran. At the National Census of 2006, its population was 10,887 in 2,171 households. There were 9,145 inhabitants in 2,274 households at the following census of 2011. At the most recent census of 2016, the population of the rural district was 7,076 in 2,085 households. The largest of its 79 villages was Sari Qayah, with 500 people.

References 

Hashtrud County

Rural Districts of East Azerbaijan Province

Populated places in East Azerbaijan Province

Populated places in Hashtrud County